The United States Swimming National Championships (a.k.a. "Nationals") are held annually, in summer. The event is organized by USA Swimming, and is held in a long course (50m) pool. In the past, and as recently as 2007, there were 2 meets annually: and Spring and Summer Nationals. The Spring meet began as a 25-yard (short course) meet, while the Summer meet was long course. Prior to USA Swimming's creation in the late 1970s, the meet was run by the AAU.

Phillips 66 began sponsoring the meet in 1973, which continues through today although the branding of the sponsorship changed to ConocoPhillips in the early 2000s. This is one of the longest sponsorships in U.S. sports.

Venues

1962 – Cuyahoga Falls, Ohio (men's), Chicago, Illinois (women's)
1963 – Oak Park, IL (men's), High Point, North Carolina (women's)
1964 – Palo Alto, California
1965 – Toledo, Ohio
1966 – Lincoln, Nebraska
1967 – Oak Park, IL (men's), Philadelphia, Pennsylvania (women's)
1968 – Lincoln, Nebraska
1969 – Louisville, Kentucky
1970 – Los Angeles, California
1971 – Houston, Texas
1972 – Hershey, Pennsylvania
1972 – Olympic Trials, Portage Park, Illinois
1973 – Louisville, Kentucky
1974 – Concord, California
1975 – Kansas City, Kansas
1976 – Philadelphia, Pennsylvania
1976 – Olympic Trials, Long Beach, California
1977 – Mission Viejo, California
1978 – The Woodlands, Texas (together with the US World Championships Trials)
1979 – Ft. Lauderdale, Florida
1980 – Irvine, California
1981 – Brown Deer, Wisconsin
1982 – Indianapolis, Indiana
1983 – Fresno, California
1984 – Ft. Lauderdale, Florida
1985 – Mission Viejo, California
1986 – Santa Clara, California
1987 – Fresno, California
1988 – Austin, Texas (together with US Olympic Trials)
1989 – Los Angeles, California
1990 – Austin, Texas (together with the US World Championships Trials)
1991 – Ft. Lauderdale, Florida
1992 – Mission Viejo, California
1993 – Austin, Texas
1994 – Indianapolis, Indiana
1995 – Pasadena, California
1996 – Ft. Lauderdale, Florida
1997 – Nashville, Tennessee
1998 – Fresno, California
1999 – Minneapolis, Minnesota
2000 – replaced by the US Olympic Trials
2001 – Fresno, California
2002 – Ft. Lauderdale, Florida
2003 – College Park, Maryland
2004 – Stanford, California
2005 – Irvine, California
2006 – Irvine, California
2007 – Indianapolis, Indiana
2008 – incorporated into US Olympic Trials
2009 – Indianapolis, Indiana
2010 – Irvine, California
2011 – Palo Alto, California
2012 – replaced by the US Olympic Trials in Omaha, Nebraska
2013 – Indianapolis, Indiana
2014 – Irvine, California
2015 – San Antonio, Texas
2016 – incorporated into US Olympic Trials
2017 – Indianapolis, Indiana (together with the US World Championships Trials)
2018 – Irvine, California
2019 – Stanford, California
2021 – incorporated into US Olympic Trials
2022 – Irvine, California (separate from the US International Team Trials)
2023 – Indianapolis, Indiana
2024 – incorporated into US Olympic Trials

Men's Team Champions
1989 - Little Rock Dolphins

Championships records

Men

Women

References

 
National Championships
Recurring sporting events established in 1962
National swimming competitions
National championships in the United States
1962 establishments in the United States